The 1979 North Carolina A&T Aggies football team represented North Carolina A&T State University as member of the Mid-Eastern Athletic Conference (MEAC) during the 1978 NCAA Division I-AA football season. Led by third-year head coach James McKinley, the Aggies compiled an overall record of 4–6–1 with a mark of 2–2–1 in conference play, placing third in the MEAC. North Carolina A&T played home games at World War Memorial Stadium in Greensboro, North Carolina.

Schedule

References 

North Carolina AandT
North Carolina A&T Aggies football seasons
North Carolina AandT Aggies football